Events in the year 2006 in China.

Incumbents 
 Party General Secretary – Hu Jintao
 President – Hu Jintao
 Premier – Wen Jiabao
 Vice President – Zeng Qinghong
 Vice Premier – Huang Ju
 Congress Chairman – Wu Bangguo
 Conference Chairman – Jia Qinglin

Governors  
 Governor of Anhui Province – Wang Jinshan
 Governor of Fujian Province – Huang Xiaojing
 Governor of Gansu Province – Lu Hao (until this year)
 Governor of Guangdong Province – Huang Huahua 
 Governor of Guizhou Province – Shi Xiushi then Lin Shusen 
 Governor of Hainan Province – Wei Liucheng 
 Governor of Hebei Province – Ji Yunshi then Guo Gengmao 
 Governor of Heilongjiang Province – Zhang Zuoji 
 Governor of Henan Province – Li Chengyu 
 Governor of Hubei Province – Luo Qingquan 
 Governor of Hunan Province – Zhou Bohua then Zhou Qiang 
 Governor of Jiangsu Province – Liang Baohua 
 Governor of Jiangxi Province – Huang Zhiquan 
 Governor of Jilin Province – Wang Min (until December), Han Changfu (starting December)
 Governor of Liaoning Province – Zhang Wenyue 
 Governor of Qinghai Province – Song Xiuyan 
 Governor of Shaanxi Province – Chen Deming then Yuan Chunqing 
 Governor of Shandong Province – Han Yuqun 
 Governor of Shanxi Province – Yu Youjun 
 Governor of Sichuan Province – Zhang Zhongwei 
 Governor of Yunnan Province – Xu Rongkai 
 Governor of Zhejiang Province – Lü Zushan

Events

March
 March 3: The 2006 Chinese People's Political Consultative Conference opens in Beijing.

April
 April 14: A man disfigured in a bear attack becomes the first in China to have a face transplant.
 April 30: 24 miners killed in a mine explosion in the Chinese province of Shaanxi.

May
 May 11: Baidu Baike, a Chinese collaborative online encyclopedia, is launched in People's Republic of China by Baidu.com, modelled on Wikipedia but heavily self censored. Wikipedia is largely inaccessible without a proxy in China.
 May 20: The construction of the Three Gorges Dam wall, the largest dam in the world, is completed in the People's Republic of China.

July
 July 1: The Qingzang railway launches a trial operation, making Tibet the last province-level entity of China to have a conventional railway.
 July 6: The Nathula Pass between India and China, sealed during the Sino-Indian War, re-opens for trade after 44 years.
 July 7: An explosion in the village of Dongzhai village in Shanxi province in north China kills 43 people.
 July 11: Liu Xiang of China sets a new World Record for the 110 metres hurdles at the Super Grand Prix in Lausanne with a time of 12.88 seconds.
 July 22: July 2006 Yunnan earthquake: An earthquake measuring 5.1-5.2 in magnitude hits a mountainous region of Yunnan Province in south China killing at least 18-19 people and injuring at least 60 more.
 July 27: More than 80 people dead and missing as a result of Typhoon Kaemi.

August
 August 10: More than 1.5 million Chinese evacuate while Super Typhoon Saomai, the strongest to land in China in 50 years, makes landfall in Wenzhou, Zhejiang.

November
 November 13: Nanshan Colliery disaster: A colliery explosion in Shanxi province in northern China kills at least 24 miners.

Deaths
 December 20: Ma Ji, Chinese actor (born 1934)

See also
 List of Chinese films of 2006
 Chinese Super League 2006
 Hong Kong League Cup 2006–07

References 

 
Years of the 21st century in China